Kai Fan Leung (born 11 September 1983) is a Hong Kong professional darts player who plays in Professional Darts Corporation (PDC) and World Darts Federation (WDF) events.

Career

In 2017, he qualified for the UK Open, losing in the first round. He then represented Hong Kong in the World Cup of Darts alongside Royden Lam, but they lost out in the first round to the Russian pairing of Boris Koltsov and Aleksandr Oreshkin. Leung won the 2017 North & East Asia Qualifier for the 2018 PDC World Darts Championship, where he lost 2–0 to Paul Lim in the preliminary round.

Leung won a two-year PDC Tour Card on 17 January 2020, beating Lisa Ashton 5–4 in the play-off match at UK Q-School.

In 2022, Leung was runner up at the 2022 Isle of Man Masters, losing to Ryan Hogarth of Scotland 4-5 in the Final.

World Championship results

PDC
 2018: Preliminary round (lost to Paul Lim 2–0) (sets)

WDF
 2023:

Performance timeline

PDC

References

3. https://www.dartslive.com/dsp/#hk
4. https://www.scmp.com/sport/hong-kong/article/3048821/fat-beauty-kevin-leung-thought-darts-was-stupid-until-he-hit-triple

External links

1983 births
Living people
Hong Kong darts players
PDC World Cup of Darts team Hong Kong
Professional Darts Corporation former tour card holders